Transplantation is a peer-reviewed medical journal covering transplantation medicine. The editor-in-chief is Jeremy R. Chapman (University of Sydney). It was established in 1963 and is published by Wolters Kluwer on behalf of The Transplantation Society and the International Liver Transplantation Society.

Its sister journal, Transplantation Direct, is an online-only open access, peer-reviewed medical journal also covering transplantation medicine, established in 2015. The journal's executive editor is Edward K. Geissler (University of Regensburg).

Abstracting and indexing 
The journal is abstracted and indexed in:

According to the Journal Citation Reports, the journal has a 2020 impact factor of 4.743, ranking it 41 out of 158 journals in the category "Immunology", 10 out of 203 journals in the category "Surgery", and 3 out of 25 journals in the category "Transplantation".

References

External links 
 

Organ transplantation journals
Publications established in 1963
Wolters Kluwer academic journals
Monthly journals
English-language journals